Francis X. Tenaglio (born January 8, 1949) is an American politician who served as a Democratic member of the Pennsylvania House of Representatives 159th district from 1977 to 1978.

Tenaglio ran unsuccessfully for Governor of New Jersey in 2005 and for US Congress in New Jersey's 1st congressional district in 2012.

Early life and education
Tenaglio was born in Philadelphia, Pennsylvania and graduated from Cardinal O'Hara High School in Springfield, Pennsylvania.

He received a B.Sc. degree from West Chester State College (now known as West Chester University) in 1971.

Civilian career
Tenaglio worked as a senior teller at Western Savings Bank, a licensed real estate salesperson, an account executive for Rothacker Advertising (1982-1984), manager and director of marketing Sharon Savings Bank (1984-1991) and as a social studies teacher at South Philadelphia High School (1991-2005).

Political career
Tenaglio was a member of the Chester Democratic Committee and was elected as a Democrat to the Pennsylvania House of Representatives, 159th district for the 1977 term.  He was an unsuccessful candidate for reelection to the House in 1979 and was succeeded by Arthur Earley.

Tenaglio had an unsuccessful campaign for Governor of New Jersey in 2005 and for U.S. Congress in the Democratic Primary of New Jersey's 1st congressional district against incumbent Rob Andrews.

Personal life
Tenaglio is the author of three books:

A Declaration of American Intentions - A U.S. Citizenship Self Help Guide (2014)
How Mr. Donaldson Does Washington (2015)
Poems From an Irish Mind (2017)

References

Democratic Party members of the Pennsylvania House of Representatives
1949 births
Living people
West Chester University alumni